Medal for Bravery also known as Medal of Gavrilo Princip is a Medal of Republika Srpska. It was established in 1993 by the Constitution of Republika Srpska and 'Law on orders and awards' valid since 28 April 1993.

It is named after Gavrilo Princip.

Ranks
The Medal for Bravery (Medal of Gavrilo Princip) is a  Military decoration and has two classes - gold and silver, it is awarded for one or more brave deeds to individuals or smaller units for acts of collective courage.

The inscription on the medal reads: Gavrilo Princip for bravery, Republika Srpska.

See also 
 Gavrilo Princip
 Orders, decorations and medals of Republika Srpska

References

Orders, decorations, and medals of Republic of Srpska
Awards established in 1993